The Borough of Ashford is a local government district with borough status in Kent, England. It borders five other Kent districts, as well as East Sussex to the south-west. Ashford Borough Council's main offices are in the town of Ashford. The borough was formed on 1 April 1974, by the merger of the then Borough of Tenterden with Ashford urban district as well as the Rural Districts of East Ashford, West Ashford and Tenterden. Covering 58,000 hectares, it is the largest district by area in Kent.

The Borough is divided into 39 civil parishes, centred on the villages as well as the historic town of Tenterden.

From the 1960s onwards Ashford has experienced phases of rapid urban growth, creating new suburbs such as Stanhope and, more recently, Singleton. Today's urban growth is partially shaped by the de facto corridors created by the M20 motorway, the High Speed 1 line and several other rail lines which converge on the town's railway station; this has contributed to particular development pressure on, and the development of, greenfield sites in and adjacent to the town, especially, but not exclusively, to the south and west—for example at Sevington.

Local government

Elections

There are 43 electoral wards in the Borough; 18 of those cover Ashford town, broadly defined. The Conservative party has held control of the council for much of its history, apart from periods when no party had a majority, and has had a majority since the 2003 election. The council's make-up can change quickly because it is elected as a whole (not one-third at a time) every four years. After the election in 2011 the council was made up as follows:

As of June 2016 there were 42 civil parishes within Ashford District, including Tenterden which is the only town council. Ashford being unparished.

Population

Expansion and growth 
In 1961, the populations of the districts which make up the present borough were: Ashford U.D. : 28,000, East Ashford R.D. : 10,610, West Ashford R.D. :10,734, and the Borough of Tenterden : 7,626 giving a total of 56,970. Forty years later the population had almost doubled: the 2001 census recorded a population of 102,661. Ashford Borough Council predicts that the population will reach 141,100 by the year 2021.

The 2011 census reported Ashford as having:
 117,956 residents
 47,787 households (an increase of just under 6,000 since 2001)
 83% of residents describing their health as 'good' or 'very good'
 13% of residents describing their health as 'fair'
 16.8% of those over the age of 16 having no qualifications
 an unemployment rate of 2.6% of all economically active people aged 16–74 (an increase since 2001 of 0.2%)

Economy and Infrastructure 

The area's economy, once strongly dominated by agriculture and associated activities such as brewing and food production as well as some quarrying of ragstone and brick manufacture, evolved into a centre for rail engineering in the 19th century, and is now primarily light industrial and commercial, with the notable exception of Hitachi's rail depot. The borough's local plan ("Local Plan to 2030") continues to plan for new housing in and around the town, such as the development at Finberry.

From the historic town centre, roads radiate out in the following directions: NW to Charing and Maidstone and SE to Hythe and Folkestone (A20/M20 in each direction); south to Hamstreet, Lydd and Romney Marsh and then westwards to Hastings (A2070); SW to Tenterden and NE to Wye and Canterbury (A28) and finally north to Ashford's historic port at Faversham (A251).

Historic buildings and landscape character 
There are more than 400 listed buildings in the district. This includes 33 churches listed in the highest grading in the national listing system (Grade I) as well as many oast houses and pubs dating from the 17th and 18th centuries, along with some even earlier buildings such as the Black Horse at Pluckley built in the 1470s as a dry-moated farmhouse by the Dering family (see also: Little Chart).

Well-known examples of Grade I listed buildings include: the Archbishop's palace at Charing, Chilham Castle and Godinton House, as well as more domestic examples such as the row of 17th century Flemish weavers' cottages which stretches the full length of the south side of Biddenden High Street.

See also the listings: Grade I listed buildings in Ashford (borough) .

Beyond the town of Ashford, most of the borough's land area is rural, with fields, woodland and fruit orchards. Much of the woodland is coppiced. Changes in rural land use over the past century mirror those in the rest of the present County. The north-east of the borough, including the villages of Wye and Chilham, is within the Kent Downs AONB, whilst the south-west, including Rolvenden and the Isle of Oxney, is part of the High Weald AONB. In addition to these national landscape areas, the borough has many smaller Local Nature Reserves such as Hothfield Common.

References

External links
Ashford Borough Council

 
Non-metropolitan districts of Kent
Boroughs in England